The Kemp Cotton Gin Historic District encompasses the only cotton gin extant in the Rohwer area of Desha County, Arkansas.  The gin was built in 1950 by O. O. Kemp, a few years after the closure of the Rohwer War Relocation Center, where as many as 10,000 Japanese-Americans were interned during the Second World War.  After the center's closure much of its land was returned to agricultural use, and Kemp built this gin near the Missouri Pacific Railroad line that ran through Rohwer.  In addition to the gin, the complex Kemp built includes a pump house, scale house, and office.  This entire complex was listed on the National Register of Historic Places in 2005.

See also
National Register of Historic Places listings in Desha County, Arkansas

References

Buildings and structures completed in 1950
Buildings and structures in Desha County, Arkansas
Historic districts on the National Register of Historic Places in Arkansas
National Register of Historic Places in Desha County, Arkansas
Cotton industry in the United States
Cotton gin